Streptomyces noursei is a bacterium species in the genus Streptomyces.

Uses
Nystatin is a polyene antifungal medication isolated from S. noursei.

References

External links

 Streptomyces noursei on Encyclopedia of Life
Type strain of Streptomyces noursei at BacDive -  the Bacterial Diversity Metadatabase

noursei
Bacteria described in 1953